Leati Joseph "Joe" Anoaʻi (born May 25, 1985), better known by the ring name Roman Reigns, is an American professional wrestler and former American football player. He is currently signed to WWE on the SmackDown brand, where he is the current and longest-reigning WWE Universal Champion in his second reign and the current WWE Champion in his fourth reign. Considered one of the best wrestlers in the world, his current championship reigns make him WWE's undisputed world champion, referred to within the company as the Undisputed WWE Universal Champion. He is the leader of The Bloodline stable and is a member of wrestling's renowned Anoaʻi family.

After playing college football for Georgia Tech, Anoaʻi started his professional football career with brief off-season stints with the Minnesota Vikings and Jacksonville Jaguars of the National Football League (NFL) in 2007. He then played a full season for the Canadian Football League's (CFL) Edmonton Eskimos in 2008 before his release and retirement from football. He then pursued a career in professional wrestling and was signed by WWE in 2010, reporting to their developmental territory Florida Championship Wrestling (FCW). Under the ring name Roman Reigns, he made his main roster debut in 2012 as a member of The Shield alongside Dean Ambrose and Seth Rollins. They teamed together until disbanding in 2014, after which Reigns entered singles competition, though the trio would occasionally reunite until Ambrose left WWE in 2019.

Reigns is a six-time world champion in WWE, having held the WWE Championship four times and the WWE Universal Championship twice. In 2022, he became the longest reigning Universal Champion with his ongoing reign at + days, which is recognized as the sixth-longest world championship reign in the promotion's history, and the longest reign of any WWE championship since 1988. He is also a one-time WWE United States Champion, a one-time WWE Intercontinental Champion, a one-time WWE Tag Team Champion (with Rollins), the 2015 Royal Rumble winner, and the 2014 Superstar of the Year. He tied the WWE record for most eliminations in a Survivor Series match with four in the 2013 event and also previously held the record for most eliminations in a Royal Rumble match with 12 in the 2014 event. Upon winning the Intercontinental Championship, he became the 28th Triple Crown Champion and the 17th Grand Slam Champion. Reigns has headlined numerous pay-per-view events, including WWE's flagship event WrestleMania six times (31, 32, 33, 34, 37, and 38). Additionally, he was ranked at No. 1 in Pro Wrestling Illustrateds annual PWI 500 list of the top 500 singles wrestlers in 2016 and 2022.

From 2014 onwards, WWE positioned Reigns as a heroic character and attempted to establish him as their next "face of the company", which was met with intense disapproval by audiences and critics. Following his return from a hiatus in August 2020, he was repackaged as a villainous character nicknamed "The Tribal Chief" and "Head of the Table", which was generally met with acclaim. By the end of 2021, however, complaints of overexposure and staleness began to resurface in the wrestling media. By 2023, however, wrestling media sentiment turned positive toward Reigns again, with his work with The Bloodline and Sami Zayn receiving general acclaim.

Early life 
Leati Joseph Anoaʻi was born in Pensacola, Florida, on May 25, 1985. He has Arbëreshë, English, Italian, and Samoan ancestry. Both his father Sika and his brother Rosey were professional wrestlers. As a member of the Anoaʻi wrestling family, his cousins include The Tonga Kid, Rikishi, Umaga, and Yokozuna, while his non-biological first cousins once removed include Jimmy and Jey Uso and Dwayne "The Rock" Johnson. Anoaʻi attended Pensacola Catholic High School and Escambia High School, before going on to major in management at the Georgia Institute of Technology. He later said that he considers Bret Hart his wrestling idol.

Football career 
Anoaʻi played football for three years at Pensacola Catholic High School and one year at Escambia High School; in his senior year, he was named Defensive Player of the Year by the Pensacola News Journal. While at the Georgia Institute of Technology, he was a member of the Georgia Tech Yellow Jackets football team along with Calvin Johnson, who later became a wide receiver in the National Football League (NFL). Anoaʻi was a three-year starter beginning in his sophomore year and was also one of the team captains as a senior. He was named to the first-team All-Atlantic Coast Conference (ACC) in 2006 and earned All-ACC first-team honors with 40 tackles, two recovered fumbles and 4.5 sacks.

After going undrafted in the 2007 NFL draft, Anoaʻi was signed by the Minnesota Vikings in May 2007. He was diagnosed with leukemia after his team physical and was released later that month. The Jacksonville Jaguars signed him in August 2007, only to release Anoaʻi less than a week later before the start of the 2007 NFL season. In 2008, he was signed by the Edmonton Eskimos of the Canadian Football League (CFL). Wearing the number 99, Anoaʻi played for one season with the Eskimos, featuring in five games, of which he started three. Anoaʻi's most notable game came against the Hamilton Tiger-Cats in September, where he tied for the team lead with five tackles and had a forced fumble. Anoaʻi was released by the Eskimos on November 10, and proceeded to retire from professional football.

Professional wrestling career

World Wrestling Entertainment/WWE

Developmental territories (2010–2012) 
Anoaʻi signed a contract with WWE in 2010 and was later assigned to their developmental territory Florida Championship Wrestling (FCW). He made his televised debut on August 19, 2010, using the ring name Roman Leakee, in a 15-man battle royal, which was won by Alex Riley. On the January 16, 2011 episode of FCW, Leakee was a competitor in a 30-man Grand Royal, but was eliminated. Later in 2011, Leakee formed a tag team with Donny Marlow and the pair unsuccessfully challenged Calvin Raines and Big E Langston for the FCW Florida Tag Team Championship on July 8.

In January 2012, Leakee pinned FCW Florida Heavyweight Champion Leo Kruger in a non-title match. On the February 5 episode of FCW, he defeated Dean Ambrose and Seth Rollins in a triple threat match to become the number one contender to the FCW Florida Heavyweight Championship. He failed to win the championship when he lost to Kruger the following week. Leakee later won the FCW Florida Tag Team Championship with Mike Dalton and would drop the titles to CJ Parker and Jason Jordan shortly after.

After WWE rebranded FCW to NXT in August 2012, Anoaʻi, with the new ring name Roman Reigns and a villainous character, made his debut on the October 31 episode of NXT by defeating CJ Parker.

The Shield (2012–2014) 

Roman Reigns made his main roster television debut as on November 18, 2012 at the Survivor Series pay-per-view event alongside Dean Ambrose and Seth Rollins, assaulting Ryback during the triple threat main event for the WWE Championship, allowing CM Punk to retain the title, thus establishing themselves as villains. The trio declared themselves The Shield and vowed to rally against "injustice", while also denying working for Punk, even though they would routinely emerge from the crowd to attack Punk's adversaries, including Ryback and WWE Tag Team Champions Team Hell No (Daniel Bryan and Kane). This led to a six-man tag team Tables, Ladders, and Chairs match at TLC: Tables, Ladders & Chairs on December 16, in which Reigns, Ambrose and Rollins defeated Team Hell No and Ryback in their debut match. The Shield continued to aid Punk in January 2013, attacking both Ryback and The Rock. On the January 28 episode of Raw, it was revealed that Punk and his manager Paul Heyman had been paying The Shield and Brad Maddox to work for them.

The Shield then indistinctly ended their association with Punk while beginning a feud with John Cena, Ryback and Sheamus that directed to a six-man tag match on February 17 at Elimination Chamber, which The Shield won. The Shield then made their WrestleMania debut, where they defeated Sheamus, Randy Orton and Big Show at WrestleMania 29 in April. The following night on Raw, The Shield attempted to attack The Undertaker, but they were stopped by Team Hell No. This set up a six-man tag team match on the April 22 episode of Raw, which The Shield won. On the May 13 episode of Raw, The Shield's undefeated streak in televised six-man tag team matches ended in a disqualification loss in an elimination tag team match against Cena, Kane and Bryan.

On May 19 at Extreme Rules, Reigns and Rollins defeated Team Hell No in a tornado tag team match to win the WWE Tag Team Championship. On the June 14 episode of SmackDown, The Shield were given their first decisive loss in televised six-man tag team matches at the hands of Team Hell No and Randy Orton, when Bryan submitted Rollins. Reigns and Rollins defeated Bryan and Orton at Payback on June 16 to retain the WWE Tag Team Championship. Further successful title defenses followed against The Usos (Jimmy Uso and Jey Uso) at Money in the Bank on July 14 and The Prime Time Players (Darren Young and Titus O'Neil) at Night of Champions on September 15.

In August, The Shield began working for chief operating officer Triple H and The Authority. Their association with The Authority led them to begin a rivalry with Cody Rhodes and Goldust. At Battleground on October 6, Reigns and Rollins lost to Rhodes and Goldust in a non-title match. Reigns and Rollins lost the tag team titles to Rhodes and Goldust in a no disqualification match on the October 14 episode of Raw, following interference from Big Show. At Hell in a Cell on October 27, Reigns and Rollins failed to regain the championship in a triple threat tag team match. At Survivor Series on November 24, The Shield teamed with Antonio Cesaro and Jack Swagger to take on Rey Mysterio, The Usos, Cody Rhodes and Goldust in a traditional Survivor Series match; Reigns would win the match for his team. At TLC: Tables, Ladders & Chairs on December 15, The Shield were defeated by CM Punk in a 3-on-1 handicap match, after Reigns accidentally speared Ambrose. At the Royal Rumble on January 26, 2014, Reigns entered the Royal Rumble match at number 15 and went on to eliminate 12 competitors in the match, a record that was later broken by Braun Strowman in 2018. Reigns would be the runner-up in the match after being lastly eliminated by Batista. The next night on Raw, The Shield competed in a six-man tag team match against Daniel Bryan, Sheamus and John Cena, with all three members of the winning team qualifying for the Elimination Chamber match for the WWE World Heavyweight Championship, which The Shield lost via disqualification after The Wyatt Family interfered and attacked Cena, Bryan and Sheamus. A six-man tag team match pitting The Shield against The Wyatt Family on February 24 at the Elimination Chamber pay-per-view was arranged, in which The Shield lost after Ambrose abandoned the match mid-way through.

In March, The Shield came out to seemingly attack Jerry Lawler, only to attack Kane instead, turning all three men face in the process. This led to a match between The Shield and Kane and The New Age Outlaws (Billy Gunn and Road Dogg) at WrestleMania XXX on April 6, which The Shield won. The feud with Kane also prompted The Shield to sever ties with Triple H, who reformed Evolution to counteract them. The Shield then defeated Evolution at both Extreme Rules on May 4 and Payback on June 1. On the Raw following Payback, Rollins turned on The Shield and aligned himself with Triple H and The Authority.

Controversial rise to main event status (2014–2015) 

Following Rollins's betrayal, Reigns would briefly continue teaming with Ambrose, before embarking on a singles run and being quickly placed into world title contention. After winning a battle royal Reigns was inserted into a ladder match for the vacant WWE World Heavyweight Championship at Money in the Bank on June 29; however the match was won by John Cena. His second consecutive pay-per-view main event was at Battleground on July 20, where Reigns again challenged for the title, this time in a fatal four-way match involving Cena, Kane, and Randy Orton, which Cena again won. Following the event, Reigns began a feud with Orton, culminating in a match at SummerSlam on August 17, which Reigns won.

The next month, a singles match was set up between Reigns and Rollins for Night of Champions on September 21, but Reigns developed a legitimate incarcerated hernia which required surgery prior to the event. As a result of Reigns being unable to compete, Rollins was declared the winner via forfeit. Reigns returned on the December 8 episode of Raw, accepting a Slammy Award for "Superstar of the Year". At TLC on December 14, Reigns interfered during Rollins's match with John Cena, attacking Rollins and Big Show. This started a feud between Reigns and Big Show, in which Reigns defeated him multiple times by countout and disqualification.

Reigns then entered the 2015 Royal Rumble match on January 25, which he won after lastly eliminating Rusev, therefore granting him a WWE World Heavyweight Championship match at WrestleMania 31. After his victory, Reigns was jeered heavily by the crowd, despite portraying a heroic character. On the February 2 episode of Raw, Reigns suffered his first pinfall loss in singles competition on the main roster when Big Show defeated him after interference from Rollins. Reigns then successfully defended his WrestleMania title shot against Daniel Bryan at Fastlane on February 22. At WrestleMania 31 on March 29, Seth Rollins cashed in his Money in the Bank contract while Reigns's main event match with Brock Lesnar was in progress, turning it into a triple threat match, which Reigns lost when he was pinned by Rollins.

In April, Reigns resumed his feud with Big Show, which culminated on April 26 in a Last Man Standing match at Extreme Rules, which Reigns won. On May 17 at Payback, Reigns failed to win the world title from Rollins in a fatal four-way match that also involved Orton and Ambrose. On June 14 at Money in the Bank, Reigns competed in his first Money in the Bank ladder match, which he failed to win after Bray Wyatt interfered and attacked him. On July 17 at Battleground, Wyatt defeated Reigns after Luke Harper interfered and attacked Reigns. He would enlist the help of Ambrose in order to take on the reformed Wyatt Family, with the duo defeating Wyatt and Harper at SummerSlam on August 23. The following night on Raw, Reigns and Ambrose were attacked by Wyatt's new ally, the debuting Braun Strowman. On September 20 at Night of Champions, Reigns and Ambrose teamed with Chris Jericho, but were defeated by Wyatt, Harper and Strowman. The feud between Reigns and Wyatt ended at the Hell in a Cell pay-per-view event on October 25, where Reigns defeated Wyatt in a Hell in a Cell match.

WWE World Heavyweight Champion (2015–2016) 

On the October 26 episode of Raw, Reigns defeated Alberto Del Rio, Dolph Ziggler, and Kevin Owens in a fatal four way to become the number one contender for the WWE World Heavyweight Championship. However, champion Seth Rollins legitimately injured his knee on November 4 and vacated the title the following day, which led to a tournament to crown a new champion. Reigns defeated Big Show in the first round, Cesaro in the quarterfinals, Alberto Del Rio in the semifinals, and Dean Ambrose in the finals at Survivor Series on November 22 to win the WWE World Heavyweight Championship for the first time. Immediately afterward, Sheamus cashed in his Money in the Bank contract and defeated Reigns, thus ending Reigns' reign after only five minutes. On December 13, Reigns failed to regain the title from Sheamus in a Tables, Ladders and Chairs match at TLC: Tables, Ladders & Chairs following interference by The League of Nations (Alberto Del Rio and Rusev), attacking Triple H in anger after the match. The next night on Raw, Vince McMahon granted Reigns a title rematch against Sheamus, under the stipulation that if Reigns lost, he would be forced to retire. Reigns managed to win after overcoming interferences from McMahon, Del Rio and Rusev, regaining the WWE World Heavyweight Championship in the process. At a house show on December 30, he had his nose legitimately broken during his match against Sheamus, and later underwent nasal reconstructive surgery which altered the appearance of his nose.

Reigns was forced by McMahon to defend his championship in the 2016 Royal Rumble match on January 24, 2016. In the match, Reigns was eliminated by eventual winner Triple H, thus losing the championship. At Fastlane on February 22, Reigns defeated Brock Lesnar and Dean Ambrose in a triple threat match to receive a WWE World Heavyweight Championship match against Triple H at WrestleMania 32 on April 3, where he defeated Triple H in the main event to become the WWE World Heavyweight Champion for a third time. After WrestleMania, Reigns began a feud with AJ Styles and successfully defended the championship against him at Payback on May 1 and then again at Extreme Rules in an Extreme Rules match on May 22. After the latter match, Reigns was attacked by a returning Seth Rollins.

At Money in the Bank on June 19, Reigns lost to Rollins, marking his first clean loss on the main roster and ending his reign at 77 days. On June 21, Anoaʻi was legitimately suspended by WWE for 30 days due to violating the WWE Wellness Program, WWE's internal drug testing program. Pro Wrestling Torch and TheWrap reported that WWE knew of Anoaʻi's violation before the event, leading to Reigns being scripted to lose his world title at the event.

On July 19 at the 2016 WWE draft, Reigns was drafted to the Raw brand. Despite Reigns's suspension, WWE continued to advertise Reigns as part of the Battleground main event, and went on to acknowledge Reigns's suspension on television. At Battleground on July 24, Reigns made his televised return, facing Rollins and Dean Ambrose for the now-renamed WWE Championship, which Ambrose won. The following night on Raw, Reigns also failed to contend for the newly announced WWE Universal Championship against Rollins at SummerSlam on August 21, as he lost to the debuting Finn Bálor in a qualifying match.

WWE Universal Champion and The Shield reunion (2016–2018) 

In August, Reigns began a feud with United States Champion Rusev, provoking a title match between the two at SummerSlam. At the event on August 21, Reigns and Rusev brawled before the match began, leading to the match being declared a no contest. In a rematch at Clash of Champions on September 25, Reigns would defeat Rusev to win the United States Championship, and retained the title against Rusev in a Hell in a Cell match at the titular event on October 30 to end their feud. At Survivor Series on November 20, Reigns made up part of Team Raw alongside Braun Strowman, Chris Jericho, Kevin Owens and Seth Rollins, in a losing effort to Team SmackDown. At Roadblock: End of the Line on December 18, Reigns faced Owens for the Universal Championship, but lost via disqualification when Chris Jericho attacked Owens to prevent Reigns from winning the match and the title. On the January 9, 2017 episode of Raw, Reigns lost the United States Championship to Jericho in a handicap match also involving Owens ending his reign at 106 days.

This led to a no disqualification rematch with Owens at the Royal Rumble on January 29 that saw Jericho being suspended above the ring in a shark cage, where Reigns lost after Braun Strowman interfered. Later in the event, Reigns entered at number 30 in the Royal Rumble match, eliminating Bray Wyatt, Chris Jericho and The Undertaker before being last eliminated by Randy Orton. At Fastlane on March 5, Reigns defeated Strowman, giving Strowman his first pinfall loss on the main roster. The following night on Raw, Reigns was chokeslammed by The Undertaker after they both joined forces to attack Strowman. This led to a No Holds Barred match between Reigns and Undertaker at WrestleMania 33 on April 2, which Reigns won in his third consecutive WrestleMania main event. The next night on Raw, Reigns opened the show to ten minutes of severe boos and chants from the crowd, attempting to stop him from speaking, before simply stating "This is my yard now" and leaving the ring. Reigns then resumed his feud with Strowman, after Strowman kayfabe injured Reigns's shoulder. A match was set up between the two at Payback on April 30, which Reigns lost. The feud between the two was put on hold after Strowman legitimately injured his elbow. 

Reigns competed in a fatal five-way match at Extreme Rules on June 4 against Bray Wyatt, Finn Bálor, Samoa Joe and Seth Rollins, with the winner becoming the number one contender for the Universal Championship. Joe would win the match after forcing Bálor to pass out to a submission hold. On the June 19 episode of Raw, Reigns was attacked by a returning Strowman, who challenged Reigns to an ambulance match at Great Balls of Fire on July 9, which Reigns lost. At SummerSlam on August 20, Reigns was pinned by Brock Lesnar in a Universal Championship match also involving Strowman and Joe. Following this, Reigns began a rivalry with John Cena, leading to a match at No Mercy on September 24, which Reigns won. The next night on Raw, Reigns described his victory over Cena as the biggest win in his career. In October, due to mutual issues with The Miz, The Miztourage (Bo Dallas and Curtis Axel) and Cesaro and Sheamus, Reigns, Ambrose and Rollins decided to reform The Shield in order to combat the aforementioned alliance. Reigns was due to team with Rollins and Ambrose at TLC: Tables, Ladders & Chairs on October 22, but he was removed from the match due to an illness concern. He was replaced by Kurt Angle and The Shield went on to win the match.

Reigns returned on the November 13 episode of Raw and challenged The New Day (Big E, Kofi Kingston and Xavier Woods) to a six-man tag team match at Survivor Series. At the event on November 19, The Shield emerged victorious over The New Day. The following night on Raw, Reigns defeated The Miz for the Intercontinental Championship, thus becoming the twenty-eighth Triple Crown and seventeenth Grand Slam champion, the second member of The Shield after Ambrose to achieve the Grand Slam. Following his title win, Reigns would successfully defend the title against Elias, Jason Jordan, Cesaro and Samoa Joe before losing it back to The Miz on the 25th Anniversary of Raw on January 22, 2018, ending his reign at 63 days.

Reigns competed in the 2018 Royal Rumble match on January 28, but was the last participant eliminated by eventual winner Shinsuke Nakamura. After defeating Bray Wyatt on the February 5 episode of Raw, Reigns qualified for the Elimination Chamber match, which he won, earning the right to face Brock Lesnar for the Universal Championship at WrestleMania 34. At WrestleMania on April 8, Reigns failed to win the championship from Lesnar. They had a rematch for the championship at the Greatest Royal Rumble on April 27, this time in a steel cage match, which Reigns narrowly lost after spearing Lesnar through the cage wall.

After defeating Samoa Joe at Backlash on May 6 and Jinder Mahal at Money in the Bank on June 17, Reigns then entered a feud with Bobby Lashley, where both men believed that they were the rightful challenger to Lesnar's championship. This set up a match at Extreme Rules on July 15, where Lashley was victorious. The following night on Raw, two triple threat matches were set to determine Lesnar's challenger for SummerSlam. Reigns and Lashley won their respective matches, setting up a number one contender's match between the two the following week, which Reigns won. At SummerSlam on August 19, Reigns defeated Lesnar and won the Universal Championship for the first time in his career. Reigns went on to reignite his feud with Braun Strowman, who was the Money in the Bank holder. Strowman would also ally himself with Dolph Ziggler and Drew McIntyre in order to challenge The Shield. Reigns then faced Strowman at Hell in a Cell on September 16 in a Hell in a Cell match, which ended in a no contest after Brock Lesnar returned and attacked both men. On October 6 at Super Show-Down, The Shield defeated Strowman, Ziggler and McIntyre in a six-man tag team match before losing to them in a rematch on Raw two nights later.

A triple threat match between Reigns, Strowman and Lesnar for the Universal Championship was scheduled for the Crown Jewel event, however, on October 22, Reigns relinquished the title and announced his hiatus on Raw, revealing that his leukemia had returned after 11 years of privately battling it and being in remission. Following this announcement, Reigns would go on an indefinite hiatus to receive treatment. Reigns was first diagnosed in May 2007 when he was signed to the Minnesota Vikings, and went into remission around two years after the initial diagnosis.

Return from leukemia (2019–2020) 

On February 25, 2019, Reigns made his return to Raw, revealing that his leukemia was once again in remission to a huge ovation from the crowd. Later in the night, Reigns and Rollins would appear to assist Ambrose from an attack by Drew McIntyre, Bobby Lashley, Elias, and Baron Corbin. The following week on Raw, Ambrose assisted Reigns and Rollins from another attack by the four, before the trio performed their signature pose, officially reuniting the group for the third time. The Shield defeated the team of McIntyre, Lashley, and Corbin at Fastlane on March 10. On the March 25 episode of Raw, Reigns accepted a challenge from McIntyre for a match at WrestleMania 35. At the event on April 7, Reigns was successful in defeating McIntyre.

During the 2019 WWE Superstar Shake-up, Reigns was drafted to the SmackDown brand on the April 16 episode of SmackDown, with WWE's announcers describing Reigns as "SmackDown's greatest ever acquisition", as well as the future of SmackDown and WWE. During the episode, Reigns attacked Elias and Vince McMahon. The following week, Elias challenged Reigns to a match at Money in the Bank on May 19 which Reigns accepted and also won. On the May 20 episode of Raw, Reigns, who appeared via the wild card rule, was interrupted by Shane McMahon, who was still bothered by Reigns' earlier attack on his father. Reigns then challenged Shane to a match at Super ShowDown, which the latter accepted. At Super ShowDown on June 7, Reigns lost to McMahon after interference from McIntyre. Reigns defeated McIntyre at Stomping Grounds on June 23, despite interference from McMahon. The following night on Raw, Reigns was saved by The Undertaker from an assault from McMahon and McIntyre. Reigns and Undertaker teamed up to defeat McMahon and McIntyre in a No Holds Barred tag team match at Extreme Rules on July 14.

On the July 30 episode of SmackDown, an unidentified person pushed lighting equipment on Reigns. The following week, Reigns was again targeted by the attacker as he was a victim of a hit and run. After ruling out Samoa Joe and Buddy Murphy as suspects, Reigns next investigated Daniel Bryan and Erick Rowan due to testimony from Murphy and seemingly incriminating video footage. However, Bryan revealed the attacker as a man who merely resembled Rowan. Nonetheless, Reigns found additional footage that showed Rowan pushing over the equipment. Rowan then admitted that it was him and admitted that he was responsible for the hit and run as well. This caused Bryan and Rowan to split due to Rowan lying, and a no disqualification match between Reigns and Rowan was scheduled for Clash of Champions on September 15, which Rowan won after interference from a returning Luke Harper. Reigns would later defeat Rowan in a lumberjack match on the 20th Anniversary of SmackDown and subsequently team with Bryan to defeat Rowan and Harper at Hell in a Cell on October 6 in a tornado tag team match to end the feud. At Crown Jewel on October 31, Reigns was part of Team Hogan (alongside Rusev, Ricochet, Shorty G, and Ali), defeating Team Flair (Randy Orton, King Corbin, Bobby Lashley, Shinsuke Nakamura, and Drew McIntyre).

In November, Reigns began a feud with King Corbin and his allies Dolph Ziggler and Robert Roode. Reigns was named team captain for SmackDown at Survivor Series on November 24, where he and his four teammates defeated Team Raw and Team NXT in a five-on-five-on-five tag team elimination match. During the match, Corbin caused Mustafa Ali to be eliminated. Reigns responded by spearing Corbin and allowing him to be eliminated. This led to a tables, ladders, and chairs match being arranged for the TLC pay-per-view on December 15, which Reigns lost after interference from Ziggler and The Revival (Dash Wilder and Scott Dawson). At the Royal Rumble on January 26, 2020, Reigns defeated Corbin in a falls count anywhere match, after receiving assistance from The Usos. Later that night, he entered the Royal Rumble match, but was the last competitor eliminated by the eventual winner Drew McIntyre. At Super ShowDown on February 27, Reigns defeated Corbin in a steel cage match to end their feud.

The following night on SmackDown, Reigns challenged Goldberg for the Universal Championship, leading to a match between the two being set up for WrestleMania 36. However, on April 3, it was announced that Braun Strowman would replace Reigns at the event, after Reigns pulled out of the event amid concerns surrounding the COVID-19 pandemic and his being immunocompromised from his leukemia. Following WrestleMania, Reigns continued to remain absent from WWE programming in the midst of the pandemic, telling Hindustan Times: "For me, I just had to make a choice for my family. The company (WWE) has done everything that they can to make it the safest work environment possible. It is not the workplace that I was necessarily concerned about. The decision was taken mainly because each performer travels so much, and we are all such a diverse group and from all over the place. I'm not convinced, and I can't trust the fact that everybody is taking it as seriously and locking themselves down at home like I am. I trust my life with my co-workers every time I step foot in the ring, but I just can't put the same trust when it has my children, my wife, and my family involved."

The Tribal Chief (2020–present) 

Reigns returned at SummerSlam on August 23, attacking the new Universal Champion "The Fiend" Bray Wyatt, and Braun Strowman after their match for the title. On the following SmackDown, Reigns aligned himself with his new manager, Paul Heyman, turning heel for the first time since 2014. At Payback on August 30, Reigns defeated defending champion The Fiend and Strowman in a No Holds Barred Triple Threat match to win the Universal Championship for the second time.

Reigns then began a rivalry with his cousin Jey Uso. In his first championship defense at Clash of Champions on September 27, Reigns retained the title against Jey Uso by technical knockout, after Reigns viciously beat down Jey, and Jimmy Uso threw in the towel. After this, Reigns granted Jey a rematch at the Hell in a Cell event, and the match was later confirmed as a Hell in a Cell match, with the added stipulation of being an "I Quit" match. In the middle of the rivalry with Jey, Reigns successfully defended his title against Strowman on the October 16 episode of SmackDown. At Hell in a Cell on October 25, Reigns made Jey quit after attacking the injured Jimmy, thus retaining his title. Due to the loss, Jey was ordered to follow Reigns' commands and address him as "The Tribal Chief", thus turning him into a villainous character.

At Survivor Series on November 22, Reigns defeated Raw's WWE Champion Drew McIntyre in a Champion vs. Champion match, before beginning a feud with Kevin Owens, after Reigns believed Owens to be disrespecting his family. Reigns successfully defended the title against Owens in a TLC match at TLC: Tables, Ladders & Chairs on December 20, in a Steel Cage match on the December 25 episode of SmackDown, and in a Last Man Standing match at the Royal Rumble on January 31, 2021, respectively.> Reigns then retained his title against Daniel Bryan at both Elimination Chamber on February 21 and Fastlane on March 21. At this time, Reigns would also feud with Edge, who had won the Royal Rumble match. In the main event of the second night of WrestleMania 37 on April 11, Reigns defeated Bryan and Edge in a triple threat match to retain the Universal Championship after assistance from Jey. On the April 30 episode of SmackDown, Reigns defeated Bryan in a championship vs. career match, which resulted in Bryan being forced to leave SmackDown.

Reigns' next challenger for the championship was Cesaro, whom Reigns defeated at WrestleMania Backlash on May 16. Afterwards, Reigns initiated a rivalry with Rey Mysterio, after Reigns brutalized Mysterio's son Dominik. The two faced off for the championship in a Hell in a Cell match on the June 18 episode of SmackDown, with Reigns emerging as the victor. On the June 25 episode of SmackDown, while addressing his victory over Mysterio, Reigns was attacked by the returning Edge, leading to a title match between the two at Money in the Bank on July 18, where Reigns retained with the assistance of Seth Rollins. After the match, Reigns was confronted by a returning John Cena. Over the following weeks, Cena challenged Reigns for a title match at SummerSlam, and after initially rejecting Cena's challenge, a match was made official for the two at the event. At the event on August 21, Reigns defeated Cena to retain the title. Immediately after the match, Reigns would be confronted by a returning Brock Lesnar. After that, Reigns begins a rivalry with Finn Bálor, successfully defending his title against him on the September 3 episode of SmackDown, and in an Extreme Rules match at Extreme Rules on September 26 with Bálor in his Demon persona.  On October 21, at Crown Jewel, Reigns successfully defended his title against Brock Lesnar, again with the help of The Usos. On November 8, it was announced that Reigns would face WWE Champion Big E at Survivor Series in a Champion vs. Champion match, with Reigns emerging victorious at the event on November 21.

On the December 3 episode of SmackDown, Reigns successfully defended his title against Sami Zayn after Lesnar attacked Zayn. On the December 17 episode of SmackDown, Reigns fired Heyman as his manager due to Heyman's past association with Lesnar. Reigns was scheduled to defend his title against Lesnar at the Day 1 event on January 1, 2022, but the match was canceled as a result of Reigns testing positive for COVID-19. On January 16, Reigns surpassed Lesnar's 503-day reign to become the longest reigning Universal Champion, in turn having the sixth longest world championship reign in the company's history. On January 29 at the Royal Rumble event, Reigns defended the championship against Seth "Freakin" Rollins, losing the match by disqualification; however championships cannot change hands by disqualification, thus Reigns retained the title. Later that same night, he interfered in the WWE Championship match between Lesnar and Bobby Lashley, re-uniting with Heyman to cause the upset victory for Lashley to regain the championship.

On the February 4 episode of SmackDown, Goldberg would make his return to challenge Reigns to a match at Elimination Chamber for the title a match two years in the making after their match at WrestleMania 36 was called off due to Reigns taking a hiatus. At the event on February 19, Reigns defeated Goldberg via technical submission to retain the title. On the second night of WrestleMania 38 on April 3, he defeated Brock Lesnar to win the WWE Championship for a fourth time and also became the first superstar to hold both the WWE Championship and WWE Universal Championship simultaneously and be recognized as the Undisputed WWE Universal Champion. At WrestleMania Backlash on May 8, Reigns and The Usos defeated RK-Bro (Randy Orton and Riddle) and McIntyre in a six-man tag team match.

On the June 17 episode of SmackDown, Reigns successfully defended the Undisputed WWE Universal Championship against Riddle, but after the match, he was attacked by a returning Brock Lesnar to renew their rivalry and set up a Last Man Standing match at SummerSlam on July 30, in which Reigns won, ending their 7-year feud. At Clash at the Castle on September 3, Reigns successfully retained the titles against Drew McIntyre following interference from the debuting Solo Sikoa. At Crown Jewel on November 5, Reigns successfully retained the titles against Logan Paul. Three weeks later at Survivor Series WarGames on November 26, Reigns, along with The Bloodline, defeated Drew McIntyre, Kevin Owens and The Brawling Brutes (Sheamus, Ridge Holland and Butch) in a WarGames match. On January 18, 2023, his Universal Championship reign reached 871 days breaking Gunther's NXT UK Championship reign of 870 days, giving him the longest reign of any WWE championship since 1988. At the Royal Rumble on January 28, 2023, Reigns successfully defended the titles against Kevin Owens for the fourth time, and will face 2023 Men's Royal Rumble winner Cody Rhodes at WrestleMania 39. At Elimination Chamber on February 18, Reigns successfully retained the titles against Sami Zayn.

Persona, reception, and legacy

Personal life 
In early 2005, while studying at Georgia Institute of Technology, Anoaʻi met and began dating Galina Becker. They were married in December 2014, and reside in Tampa, Florida. Their first child, a daughter, was born in December 2007 and appeared with Anoaʻi in a PSA in June 2014. They had twin sons in 2016, followed by another set of twins (whose gender they did not disclose) in 2020.

Other media 
Anoaʻi made his first appearance as a playable character in the 2004 video game NCAA Football 2005. He has since appeared as Roman Reigns in WWE 2K14, WWE 2K15, WWE 2K16, WWE 2K17, WWE 2K18, WWE 2K19, WWE 2K20 (of which he was the cover star), WWE 2K Battlegrounds, WWE 2K22, and WWE 2K23.

Reigns also makes regular appearances on fellow wrestler Xavier Woods' comedic YouTube channel UpUpDownDown under the nickname "The Merchandise".

On December 31, 2019, Reigns appeared on Fox's New Year's Eve with Steve Harvey, where he defeated Dolph Ziggler in a pre-taped match.

Film

Television

Championships and accomplishments

National Collegiate Athletic Association
 NCAA
 First-team All-ACC (2006)

Professional wrestling

 CBS Sports
 Feud of the Year (2020) 
 ESPN
 Best storyline of the year (2022) – 
 Male wrestler of the year (2022)
 ESPY Awards
 Best WWE Moment (2019) – 
 Florida Championship Wrestling
 FCW Florida Tag Team Championship (1 time) – with Mike Dalton
 Pro Wrestling Illustrated
 Comeback of the Year (2019)
 Inspirational Wrestler of the Year (2018, 2019)
 Most Hated Wrestler of the Year (2016)
 Most Improved Wrestler of the Year (2015)
 Tag Team of the Year (2013) – 
 Ranked No. 1 of the top 500 singles wrestlers in the PWI 500 in 2016 and 2022
 Sports Illustrated
 Wrestler of the Year (2021)
 Wrestling Observer Newsletter
 Best Box Office Draw (2022)
 Best Gimmick (2021) 
 Most Improved (2013)
 Tag Team of the Year (2013) – 
 Most Overrated (2016)
 Worst Feud of the Year (2013) – 
 WWE
 WWE Championship (4 times, current)
 WWE Universal Championship (2 times, current)
 WWE Intercontinental Championship (1 time)
 WWE United States Championship (1 time)
 WWE Tag Team Championship (1 time) – with Seth Rollins
 28th Triple Crown Champion
 Ninth Grand Slam Champion (under current format; 17th overall)
 Royal Rumble (2015)
WWE World Heavyweight Championship Tournament (2015)

 Slammy Award (7 times)
 Breakout Star of the Year (2013) 
 Extreme Moment of the Year (2015) – 
 Faction of the Year (2013, 2014) 
 Superstar of the Year (2014)
 Trending Now (Hashtag) of the Year (2013) – #BelieveInTheShield 
 "What a Maneuver" of the Year (2013) – Spear
 WWE Year-End Awards (2 times)
 Best Reunion (2018) 
 Hottest Rivalry (2018) 
 Bumpy Award (1 time)
 Superstar of the Half-Year (2021)

Luchas de Apuestas record

Notes

References

External links 

 
 
 
 Georgia Tech profile 

1985 births
21st-century professional wrestlers
Actors of Samoan descent
American Roman Catholics
American football defensive linemen
American male professional wrestlers
American players of Canadian football
American people of Samoan descent
American professional wrestlers of Italian descent
American professional wrestlers of Samoan descent
American sportspeople of Samoan descent
Anoa'i family
Canadian football defensive linemen
Catholics from Florida
Edmonton Elks players
Georgia Tech Yellow Jackets football players
Jacksonville Jaguars players
Living people
Minnesota Vikings players
NWA/WCW/WWE United States Heavyweight Champions
Players of American football from Pensacola, Florida
Professional wrestlers from Florida
Players of Canadian football from Pensacola, Florida
Sportspeople from Pensacola, Florida
The Authority (professional wrestling) members
WWE Champions
WWE Universal Champions
WWF/WWE Intercontinental Champions
WWE Grand Slam champions
FCW Florida Tag Team Champions